Joanne Elizabeth Harten  (born 21 March 1989), also referred to as Jo Harten, is an England netball international. She was a member of the England team that won the gold medal at the 2018 Commonwealth Games. She was also a member of the England teams that won bronze medals at the 2010 Commonwealth Games and at the 2011, 2015 and 2019 Netball World Cups. At club level she has played in grand finals for Galleria Mavericks, Loughborough Lightning and Giants Netball. Harten has captained Loughborough Lightning, Giants and England teams.

Early life, family and education
Harten is originally from Harlow, Essex. She is the daughter of Barry and Chris Harten. Her family home is in Church Langley. In her youth she played various sports including association football, tennis and field hockey. Her mother, who played for a team in a local league, introduced her to netball. Harten subsequently began playing with a local club, Harlow Tegate Netball Club. Harten graduated from Loughborough University in 2011 with a BA in International Relations. She is currently studying a Graduate Certificate of Business (Sport Management) at Deakin University.

Playing career

Netball Superleague
Galleria Mavericks
Harten played for Galleria Mavericks during the 2006–07 Netball Superleague season, helping them reach the grand final. In the grand final, Harten scored 15/19 as Mavericks lost 53–45 to Team Bath.
Loughborough Lightning
Between 2007 and 2011, while attending Loughborough University, Harten played for Loughborough Lightning. In the 2008 Netball Superleague Grand Final, Harten scored 24/30 as Lightning lost 43–39 to her former team, Galleria Mavericks. In 2009 Harten was appointed Loughborough Lightning captain. In October 2019, Harten guested for Loughborough Lightning in the British Fast5 Netball All-Stars Championship, helping them win the tournament as she scored 58 of their 61 goals as they  defeated Wasps 61–35 in the final.

Australia and New Zealand
Canterbury Tactix
During the 2012 and 2013 ANZ Championship seasons Harten played for Canterbury Tactix.

Waikato Bay of Plenty Magic
Between 2014 and 2016 Harten played for Waikato Bay of Plenty Magic.

Giants Netball
Since 2017, Harten has played for the Giants Netball franchise in the Suncorp Super Netball. In her debut season with Giants, Harten helped them reach the grand final but finished on the losing side as Sunshine Coast Lightning defeated Giants 65–48. In the final she scored 20/25. Ahead of the 2020 Suncorp Super Netball season, Harten was appointed captain of the Giants team.  Harten was the victim of Cyber Bullying via Instagram for a game against the West Coast Fever that was lost due to a held ball in the last few seconds of the game.  "Love me or hate me, I compete hard for 60 mins, but no one deserves this," Harten wrote.

England
Harten made her senior debut for England on 11 November 2007 against Barbados during the 2007 World Netball Championships. She was subsequently a member of England teams that won bronze medals at the 2010 Commonwealth Games and at the 2011 and 2015 Netball World Cups. She was also a member of the England teams that won the gold medals at the 2011 and 2017 Fast5 Netball World Series tournaments. Harten was a prominent member of the England team that won the gold medal at the 2018 Commonwealth Games. In the semi-final against Jamaica, she scored a dramatic last-second winner that saw England reach a Commonwealth Games final for the first time. Harten captained England at the 2018 Fast5 Netball World Series. She made her 100th senior England appearance against Uganda on 12 July 2019 during the 2019 Netball World Cup.

Personal
Harten is a fan of Tottenham Hotspur F.C.

Honours

England
Commonwealth Games
Winners: 2018: 1
Fast5 Netball World Series
Winners: 2011, 2017: 2
Runners Up: 2010, 2012: 2
Netball Quad Series
Runners Up: 2018 (Sep), 2019: 2
Giants Netball
Suncorp Super Netball
Runners up: 2017: 1
Loughborough Lightning
Netball Superleague
Runners up: 2007–08: 1
British Fast5 Netball All-Stars Championship
Winners: 2019: 1
Galleria Mavericks
Netball Superleague
Runners up: 2006–07: 1

References 

Living people
1989 births
English netball players
Commonwealth Games bronze medallists for England
Commonwealth Games gold medallists for England
Netball players at the 2010 Commonwealth Games
Netball players at the 2014 Commonwealth Games
Netball players at the 2018 Commonwealth Games
Commonwealth Games medallists in netball
2019 Netball World Cup players
Netball Superleague players
ANZ Championship players
Suncorp Super Netball players
Mavericks netball players
Loughborough Lightning netball players
Mainland Tactix players
Waikato Bay of Plenty Magic players
Giants Netball players
Alumni of Loughborough University
Members of the Order of the British Empire
Sportspeople from Harlow
English expatriate netball people in New Zealand
English expatriate netball people in Australia
2011 World Netball Championships players
2015 Netball World Cup players
Netball players at the 2022 Commonwealth Games
Medallists at the 2010 Commonwealth Games
Medallists at the 2018 Commonwealth Games